Members of the New South Wales Legislative Council who served in the 54th Parliament were elected at the 1995 and 1999 elections. As members serve eight-year terms, half of the Council was elected in 1995 and did not face re-election in 1999, and the members elected in 1999 did not face re-election until 2007. The President was Meredith Burgmann.

References

Members of New South Wales parliaments by term
21st-century Australian politicians
20th-century Australian politicians